The Louis Penfield House is a house built by Frank Lloyd Wright, located in the Cleveland suburb of Willoughby Hills. It is one of Wright's nine Usonian homes in Ohio.

Louis Penfield, a painter and acquaintance of Wright, commissioned the architect to design a house that would accommodate his  frame. This house, then, built in 1955, is unique in its high doorways, as Wright preferred low entryways.

Notably long and thin in comparison to an average home, the house has a "floating staircase" supported by ceiling beams, a bottleneck entryway, and several walls made almost entirely of windows, one of which gives a panoramic view of the outside. The house's basic color scheme centers on red-stained wood and ochre walls.

Some years after Louis died, the family moved out, and maintained it as a rental property for five years. The Penfield house was restored over a period of four years by Paul Penfield, son of Louis, at a cost of some $100,000 USD. Since 2003, the Louis Penfield House has been one of a few Wright-designed homes where guests can spend the night.

References

 Storrer, William Allin. The Frank Lloyd Wright Companion. University Of Chicago Press, 2006,  (S.365)

External links

Louis Penfield House
Photo visit of the Louis Penfield House

Houses completed in 1955
Frank Lloyd Wright buildings
Houses in Lake County, Ohio
National Register of Historic Places in Lake County, Ohio
Houses on the National Register of Historic Places in Ohio
1955 establishments in Ohio